Outrigger canoeing at the 2019 Pacific Games was held in Samoa from 9–13 July at the Sheraton Samoa Beach Resort, Mulifanua, which is approximately 40 kilometres west of the capital, Apia.

Va'a rudderless outrigger canoes were used for all twelve medal events.

Teams
The nations competing were:

Medal summary

Medal table

Updated to 11 July 2019

Men's results

Women's results

References

Outrigger canoeing at the Pacific Games
2019 Pacific Games
Pacific Games